Kazimierz Petrusewicz (March 23 1906, Minsk — March 26 1982, Warsaw) was a Polish communist activist, member of the Polish People's Republic government, biologist, full member of the Polish Academy of Sciences , professor at the University of Warsaw, member of the Polish Workers' Party/Polish United Workers' Party during 1944–1982.

In 1947 he was awarded the Commander's Cross of the Order of Polonia Restituta.

He was the son of socialist revolutionary Kazimierz Petrusewicz, Sr (1872—1949).

References

1906 births
1982 deaths
Communist Party of Poland politicians
Recipients of the Order of Polonia Restituta (1944–1989)
Polish biologists
Members of the Polish Academy of Sciences
Scientists from Minsk